Paknampho Football Club (Thai สโมสรฟุตบอลปากน้ำโพ) formerly Paknampho NSRU F.C. (Paknampho Nakhon Sawan Rajabhat University Football  Club)is a Thailand football club based in Nakhon Sawan. They currently pl 2018 Thailand Amateur League Northern Region.

Stadium and locations

Season By Season Record

External links
 Paknampho NSRU FC on Facebook
 Paknampho NSRU FC Website
 http://www.smmsport.com/reader.php?news=218896
 http://khaonakhonsawan.com/%E0%B8%9B%E0%B8%B2%E0%B8%81%E0%B8%99%E0%B9%89%E0%B8%B3%E0%B9%82%E0%B8%9Ensru-fc-%E0%B9%80%E0%B8%A3%E0%B8%B5%E0%B8%A2%E0%B8%81%E0%B8%84%E0%B8%B1%E0%B8%94%E0%B8%95%E0%B8%B1%E0%B8%A77-8%E0%B8%9E/

Association football clubs established in 2009
2009 establishments in Thailand